The Tampa Bay Rays Radio Network is a radio network in the southeastern United States that broadcasts baseball games and related programming for the Tampa Bay Rays of Major League Baseball. Additionally, there is a 2-station Spanish language network. Since 2009, WDAE/620 in St. Petersburg, Florida, has served as the flagship station for the network.

In addition, WGES/680 in St. Petersburg, Florida airs games in Spanish but is not part of the network.

Announcers
Andy Freed has been part of the Rays Radio Network since 2005 after spending time with the Pawsox Radio Network as an announcer there as well as the Trenton Thunder.

Dave Wills also started with the Rays Radio Network in 2005 after 11 years with the Chicago White Sox.  He has been broadcasting sports since 1991 when he was the first announcer for the Kane County Cougars.

Neil Solondz joined the Rays Radio Network for the 2012 season as pregame and postgame show host. He spent the last eight years as play-by-play broadcaster for the Durham Bulls, the Rays' Triple-A affiliate. Solondz also had several stints filling in as Rays pregame and postgame show host the previous two seasons.

On the Spanish broadcasts, Ricardo Tavaras does play-by-play and Enrique Oliu provides color commentary.

Stations

Stations are current as of the 2021 season.

Former affiliates
WFLA (AM)/970: Tampa (Original flagship station)
WORL/660: Altamonte Springs/Orlando (–2019)
WFLN/1480: Arcadia, Florida (?-2012)
WHOO/1080: Kissimmee, Florida (?-2012)
WGMW/99.5: LaCrosse, Florida/Gainesville (?-2009)
WJBX/770: North Fort Myers, Florida (?-2012)
WHOO/1080: Orlando (?-2012)
WJUA/1200: Pine Island Center/Ft. Myers (2013)
WSTU/1450: Stuart, Florida (?-2012)
WIXC/1060: Titusville, Florida (~2008)
KLRG/880: Little Rock (2013-)
WIQR/1410: Prattville, Alabama (?-2016)
WWCN/99.3: Fort Myers, Florida

See also
List of Tampa Bay Rays broadcasters
List of XM Satellite Radio channels
List of Sirius Satellite Radio stations

References

Tampa Bay Rays
Major League Baseball on the radio
Sports radio networks in the United States